Ingeborg Sørensen (born 16 May 1948) is a Norwegian model. She was Playboy magazine's Playmate of the Month for its March 1975 issue.

Sørensen was born in Drammen, Norway. She was Miss Norway in 1972, and finished in second place in the Miss World 1972 competition (which was won by Australian Belinda Green).

Filmography

References

External links
 
 

1948 births
Living people
1970s Playboy Playmates
Miss World 1972 delegates